The FIP World Tag Team Championship is a professional wrestling  world tag team championship owned by the independent professional wrestling promotion Full Impact Pro (FIP). It was created and debuted on April 22, 2005, at FIP's The Usual Suspects event.

Title history
The inaugural champions were DP Associates (Eddie Vegas and Jimmy Rave). At 910 days, The Hooligans
(Devin Cutter and Mason Cutter) hold the record for the longest reign in the title's history. Sal Rinauro's and Spanky's reign holds the record for the shortest reign in the title's history at 27 days.

The Island Kings (Jaka and Sean Maluta) are the current champions in their first reign as a team and individual. They won the titles by defeating The Skulk (Adrian Alanis and Liam Gray) on November 14, 2021 at WWN Supershow: Battle Of The Belts in Clearwater, FL.

Combined reigns

By team

By wrestler

References
General

Specific

External links
Full Impact Pro.com
FIP Tag Team Title History at Cagematch.net

Full Impact Pro championships
WWNLive championships
Tag team wrestling championships